Andy Roddick was the defending champion and successfully defended his title, defeating Nicolas Kiefer, 6–2, 6–3 in the final.

Seeds

Draw

Finals

Top half

Section 1

Section 2

Section 3

Section 4

References

 Main draw
 Qualifying draw

Singles